Fedio (also spelled Fedyo) is a Syrian village located in Latakia Governorate. Fedio had a population of 4,065 in the 2004 census.

References

Villages in Syria
Villages in Syria by governorate